Shweta Bhattacharya (born 21 September 1992) is an Indian television actress.  She has also acted in popular TV shows like Jamuna Dhaki, Sindoor Khela, Jay Kanhaiya Lal Ki and Tumi Robe Nirobe.

Early life and Education
Born on 21st September 1992 in Dum Dum.Bhattyacharya passed Graduation from Sorojini Naidu College For Women in North Kolkata

Works

Film

TV series

Mahalaya

References

External links 

 

Articles with hCards
1992 births
Living people
21st-century Indian actresses
Bengali television actresses
Actresses from Kolkata